Henry Lane may refer to:

Henry Lane (officer of arms) (1833–1913), English Officer of Arms
Henry Lane (politician) (1873–1955), Australian politician
Henry Bowyer Lane (1817–1878), Canadian architect
Henry Smith Lane (1811–1881), United States Representative, Senator and Governor of Indiana
Henry Thomas Lane (1793–1834), English cricketer
Harry Lane (footballer, born 1909) (Henry William Lane, 1909–1977), English footballer
Master Juba (c. 1825–c. 1852/3), stage name of William Henry Lane

See also
Harry Lane (disambiguation)